Brachmia inornatella, the fen crest, is a moth of the family Gelechiidae. It is found in large parts of Europe, except Ireland, Norway, Lithuania and most of southern Europe.

The wingspan is 14–16 mm. Adults have been recorded on wing from May to August.

The larvae feed on various grasses, including Phragmites australis. They probably feed internally in the stems.

References

Moths described in 1850
Brachmia
Moths of Europe